Marlies Rostock (born 20 April 1960) is a former East German cross-country skier who competed from 1978 to 1980. She won a gold medal in the 4 × 5 km relay at the 1980 Winter Olympics in Lake Placid, New York.

She competed for the SG Dynamo Klingenthal / Sportvereinigung (SV) Dynamo. Rostock also won a silver medal in the 4 × 5 km relay at the 1978 FIS Nordic World Ski Championships in Lahti.

Cross-country skiing results
All results are sourced from the International Ski Federation (FIS).

Olympic Games
 1 medal – (1 gold)

World Championships
 1 medal – (1 silver)

References

External links
  
 
 World Championship results 
 
 

German female cross-country skiers
Cross-country skiers at the 1980 Winter Olympics
1960 births
Living people
Olympic medalists in cross-country skiing
FIS Nordic World Ski Championships medalists in cross-country skiing
Medalists at the 1980 Winter Olympics
Olympic gold medalists for East Germany
People from Klingenthal
Sportspeople from Saxony